James Slight may refer to: 
 Jim Slight (1855–1930), Australian cricketer
 James Slight, 19th century British agricultural writer, who wrote The Book of Farm Implements & Machines with Robert Scott Burn
 James Slight (engineer) (1785–1854), lighthouse engineer, assistant to Robert Stevenson